Kosciuszko Park is a park located at 2732 N. Avers Ave. Situated along the northern boundary of Chicago's Logan Square community area at Diversey, it is heavily frequented by residents of Avondale and is considered to be part of Jackowo.

Kosciuszko Park was commissioned in 1914 and completed in 1916; the Northwest Park District, one of Chicago's many park districts of the early twentieth century, opened the park as part of its efforts to add neighborhood parks in Northwest Chicago. As the park's original layout and landscape has changed over time, the fieldhouse is the main surviving piece of its original design. Architect Albert Arthur Schwartz began the design of the building; however, he was replaced by Frederick William Bowes halfway through its construction. The two men gave the fieldhouse a Tudor Revival design with a large half-timbered gable. The fieldhouse was added to the National Register of Historic Places on October 16, 2013.

Kosciuszko Park is named after Tadeusz Kościuszko, a national hero in Poland, Lithuania, the United States and Belarus. He led the 1794 Kościuszko Uprising against Imperial Russia and the Kingdom of Prussia as Supreme Commander of the National Armed Force (Najwyższy Naczelnik Siły Zbrojnej Narodowej).

Kosciuszko Park has long been a community center for Chicago's Northwest Side. The park once housed one of the Chicago Public Library's most frequented branches before it was closed in the 1950s, as well as one of the first two Polish Language Schools in Chicago, Polska Szkoła im. Tadeusza Kościuszki. The Polish School still continues to this day, albeit in a different location as it outgrew the fieldhouse facilities.

The park is a few blocks from St. Hyacinth Basilica, the Hairpin Arts Center, as well as the now razed Olson Park and Waterfall.

See also
 Tadeusz Kościuszko Monument (Chicago)

References

External links
 Chicago Parks District History of Kosciuszko Park

Parks in Chicago
North Side, Chicago
Polish-American culture in Chicago
Tudor Revival architecture in Illinois
National Register of Historic Places in Chicago